Eliza Missouri Bushyhead Alberty (January 3, 1839 – November 5, 1919) was a Cherokee businesswoman, school administrator and educator.

Early life and education
Eliza was born to the Rev. Jesse Bushyhead (also called U-na-du-ti) a Cherokee and Baptist minister, and Eliza Wilkinson, in 1839, in Missouri, while her father led a group of Cherokee to Indian Territory during the Trail of Tears. Upon arrival in the new territory, her father established a Baptist mission near what is now Westville, Arkansas. Alberty attended the mission until 1854, when she enrolled in the Cherokee Female Seminary at Park Hill, Cherokee Nation. She graduated in the second class from the Seminary in 1856.

Career and personal life
Shortly after her graduation, Alberty took a position teaching at the Post Oak Grove and Vann's Valley schools, both Cherokee Nation public schools, until 1859. She had married David Rowe Vann, one year earlier in 1858. Three years after Vann's death in 1870, she married Bluford West Alberty. From there she was appointed steward, along with her husband at the time, of the Cherokee Insane Asylum, known colloquially as "Belleview". In 1885, the Alberty's purchased a hotel in Tahlequah and named it "National Hotel." After her husband's death in 1889, Alberty managed the hotel and made it the most successful in Indian Territory. She was very active in the Baptist church and was commonly called "Aunt Eliza" in the community and by the those attending the seminary because of their affection for her.

Death
Alberty died at the age of 80 in Claymore, Oklahoma. Her remains were transported to Tahlequah for burial. Along the way her nephew, Owen McNair of Dallas, Texas, was presented with a boquet of Chrysanthemums grown from stems taken from the old Chief Bushyhead garden in Fort Gibson. She was laid to rest near her older brother. Denis Wolf Bushyhead, Principal Chief of the Cherokee Nation from 1879-1888.

Notable moments
Upon Oklahoma becoming a state in 1907, Alberty lobbied to have a state normal school established in Tahlequah. She was successful and to recognize her efforts, George Washington Steele, the first governor of Oklahoma, presented her with the pen he used to sign the legislation into law that created the Northeastern Normal School.

References

1839 births
1919 deaths
Cherokee Nation businesspeople
Cherokee Nation people (1794–1907)
Schoolteachers from Oklahoma
American women educators
People from Tahlequah, Oklahoma
People of Indian Territory
Pre-statehood history of Oklahoma
20th-century Native Americans
20th-century Native American women
19th-century Native Americans
19th-century Native American women